Zahid Beg is an Indian politician who served as a 16th and Member of the Uttar Pradesh Legislative Assembly from Bhadohi from 2012 to 2017 and Re-elected in 2022. His father Late Yusuf Beg was elected as a Member of parliament to Lok Sabha from the Mirzapur and was Indian labour leader served as the Vice President of Hind Mazdoor Kisan Panchayat.

Political career 

 Elected as a Member of the Legislative Assembly of Uttar Pradesh in 2012 and 2022 Uttar Pradesh Legislative Assembly elections representing the Bhadohi constituency as a member of the Samajwadi Party.
 Member of the Legislative Library Committee 2012-2013
 Former District President of Samajwadi Party from District, Bhadohi.

References 

Samajwadi Party politicians
Living people
Uttar Pradesh MLAs 2022–2027
1964 births